Yoon may refer to:
Yoon (Korean name), the ninth most common Korean family name
Yoon, stage name of Shim Ja-yoon, member of K-Pop group STAYC
Yōon, a feature of the Japanese language
Prabda Yoon (born 1973), a Thai novelist

See also
Yun (disambiguation)